Lipus or LIPUS may refer to:

Cvetka Lipuš (born 1966), an Austrian poet writing in Slovenian
Florjan Lipuš (born 1937), a Carinthian Slovene writer
Low intensity pulsed ultrasound (LIPUS), a medical technology
LIPUS = Loging - Insert - (Preview - Update) - Search (LIPUS), an IT technology